The Capture of Yanbu (Arabic: الاستيلاء على ينبع, Turkish: Yanbu'nun yakalanması; 1 December 1916 - 18 January 1917) was an Ottoman attempt to recapture the city of Yanbu during the Arab Revolt.

The attack on Yanbu commenced on 1 December 1916, when Fakhri Pasha and two brigades invaded the outskirts of the city. The Ottomans initially had repelled the Arabs from strategic points in the city. Within a couple of days Pasha controlled all routes in and out of the city. The Arab soldiers in the city began constructing a makeshift airstrip for use by British aircraft. More Arab and British reinforcements arrived and strengthened defences in the city. 

T. E. Lawrence stated, "Afterwards, old Dakhil Allah told me he had guided the Turks down to rush Yenbo in the dark that they might stamp out Faisal's army once for all; but their hearts had failed them at the silence and the blaze of lighted ships from end to end of the harbour, with the eerie beams of the searchlights revealing the bleakness of the glacis they would have to cross. So they turned back: and that night, I believe, the Turks lost their war."  

By 9 December, Arab counter-attacks opened up the routes to the city, and flights from the seaplane carrier  severely attacked the Ottoman columns. Because of the Navy's presence in the sea off Yanbu, Pasha called off all advances on the night of 11/12 December. Due to logistical errors, and counterattacks from the Arabs, the Ottomans started the retreat to Medina on 18 January 1917, thus ending the attempted recapture of Yanbu.

References

 

Yanbu
Battles of World War I involving the Ottoman Empire
Battles of World War I involving the United Kingdom
December 1916 events
January 1917 events